"The Way to Your Heart" is a 1988 hit single by Belgian band Soulsister from the album It Takes Two.

Background
A mixture of pop and rock with a very Motown-sounding tune, the song is about a boy dreaming of a girl that he‘s in love with, but she doesn't answer his love.

Chart performance
After having moderate success in The Netherlands with "Like A Mountain", the first single from their debut album, Soulsister had big success with the follow-up single “The Way to Your Heart”. It was a top 10 hit in five European Countries. The Belgian release had no B-side and was thereby sold as a half price single. Afterwards a maxi single was released with a long version (5:18) and an instrumental version. After its European success, the single was released in the US in 1989 where it charted one week, on #41 on the US Billboard Hot 100 It is their only single to appear on the Hot 100. In addition, "The Way to Your Heart" also peaked at #5 on Billboard Adult Contemporary chart.

References

External links
 Track list from the online music database Discogs

1988 songs
1988 singles
Soulsister songs
Songs written by Jan Leyers